72 Days is a 2010 Croatian-Serbian black comedy film directed by Danilo Šerbedžija and starring Rade Šerbedžija. The film was selected as the Croatian entry for the Best Foreign Language Film at the 84th Academy Awards, but it did not make the final shortlist.

Cast
 Rade Šerbedžija as Mane
 Krešimir Mikić as Branko
 Bogdan Diklić as Joja
 Živko Anočić as Todor
 Mira Banjac as Baba Neđa
 Dejan Aćimović as Mile
 Lucija Šerbedžija as Liča
 Nebojša Glogovac as Dane the policeman
 Predrag Vušović as Luka the postman
 Dragan Nikolić as Loan shark 1

See also
 List of submissions to the 84th Academy Awards for Best Foreign Language Film
 List of Croatian submissions for the Academy Award for Best Foreign Language Film

References

External links
 

2010 films
2010 black comedy films
2010s Croatian-language films
Croatian comedy films
2010s Serbian-language films
Serbian black comedy films
2010 multilingual films
Croatian multilingual films
Serbian multilingual films